Saint Margaret's Chapel, Epfig is an 11th-century Romanesque church in the hamlet of Saint Margaret, near Epfig in the Lower Rhine Department of Alsace, France. It is part of the  Route Romane d'Alsace. 

The chapel, dedicated to Saint Margaret of Antioch, is of special historic and architectural interest. The church tower dates from the 11th century. The unique porch gallery was added in the 12th century. A square chapel was added in 1516. The interior contains some fine wall paintings. In the porch is a 19th-century ossuary, containing the bones and 277 skulls of local people who died in the 1525 peasant's war. The medieval-style gardens in front of the chapel, which include a cross-shaped herbal garden and fountain, were added in 2002. The Church was classed a historic monument in 1876, following substantial restoration work in 1875. The statue of Saint Margaret which used to stand in the Chapel was stolen in 1973.

Gallery

References

External links 

 Official Website (French)
 Plan of the Chapel in the CRIP database
 Entry for St Margaret's Chapel in the official Heritage France website 

11th-century Roman Catholic church buildings in France
Churches in Bas-Rhin
Monuments historiques of Bas-Rhin
Romanesque architecture in France
Jesuit churches in France
German Peasants' War
Ossuaries